Holbrook Mann MacNeille (May 11, 1907 – September 30, 1973) was an American mathematician who worked for the United States Atomic Energy Commission before becoming the first Executive Director of the American Mathematical Society.

Personal life
MacNeille was born May 11, 1907 in New York City and was raised in Summit, New Jersey, the first of two brothers. His father was Perry Robinson MacNeille, an architect and urban planner and his mother Clausine Mann MacNeille who was active on the Summit Board of Education. His aunt was the Jungian analyst Kristine Mann.

MacNeille went to the Summit Public Schools and summered in Bailey Island, Maine. At Bailey Island he became acquainted with Frank Aydelotte who encouraged him to go to Swarthmore College from which he graduated with highest honors in 1928. Following in Aydelotte's footsteps he was a Rhodes Scholar at Balliol College, Oxford, England 1928–1930 receiving a B.A. in 1930 and an M.A. in 1947. He received a Ph.D. in Mathematics from Harvard University in 1935 where he was the first student of Marshall Harvey Stone, was a Sterling Fellow at Yale University in New Haven, Connecticut 1935–1936 and a Benjamin Peirce Instructor at Harvard between 1936–1938. During the summers he was also a partner in the Dave Richardson Laboratories in Bailey Island, Maine, which produced dogfish prepared for dissection at school laboratories.

MacNeille's Ph.D work resulted in the MacNeille completion theorem, a generalization of the construction of real numbers from the ordered set of rationals by Dedekind cuts.

Upon completing his studies, he taught mathematics at Kenyon College in Gambier, Ohio as an associate professor (1938–1941), full professor (1941–1947) and chairman of the department (1945–1947).

World War II
During several of the years at Kenyon College he was on leave as Scientific Liaison Officer (1944–1945) and Head of Mission (1945–1946) London Mission of the Office of Scientific Research and Development, American Embassy  in London, England. During (1946–1948) he was Scientific Director of the London Branch Office of the U.S. Office of Naval Research and then during (1948–1949) spent more than a year as chief of the fundamental research branch of the Atomic Energy Commission in Washington, D.C. In 1948 he received the President's Certificate of Merit from President Harry S. Truman.

After World War II
In November 1949 he became executive director of the American Mathematical Society where he served until 1954. From 1954–1961 he was professor and chairman of the Department of Mathematics at Washington University in St. Louis, and then from 1961 professor and chairman of the Department of Mathematics at Case Western Reserve University in Cleveland, Ohio until his death.

During this latter period he became interested in teaching, and directed several educational movies as part of the Calculus Film Project of the Educational Media Committee of the Mathematical Association of America.

He was killed accidentally when hit by a car while riding his bicycle.

Filmography 
 "Area under a curve"
 "The definite integral"
 "Volume of a solid of revolution"
 "Infinite acres"
 "Volume of a solid of a revolution"
 "Volume by shells"
 "Theorem of the Mean Policeman"

Awards and other positions 
 Rhodes Scholarship (1928) (Swarthmore College, Balliol)
 John William Sterling Research Fellowship, Yale University (1936–1936)
 Benjamin Peirce Instructor in Mathematics, Harvard University (1936–1938)
 President's Certificate of Merit, President Harry S. Truman (1948)
 Society for Industrial and Applied Mathematics council (1961–1964)
 Fellow of the American Association for the Advancement of Science council (1964)
 Chairman of the Mathematics Association of America committee on Educational Media (1962–1963)
 Phi Beta Kappa
 Associate editor Sigma Xi Mathematics Magazine (1962–1963)

Publications
 1936: "Extensions of Partially Ordered Sets", Proceedings of the National Academy of Sciences, Vol. 22(1): 45–50
 1937: Partially Ordered Sets, Transactions of the American Mathematical Society, Vol. 42(3): 416–460
 1938: "Extensions of Measure", Proceedings of the National Academy of Sciences, Vol. 24, No. 4 (Apr. 15, 1938), pp. 188–193
 1939: "Lattices and Boolean Rings", Bulletin of the American Mathematical Society
 1939: Extension of a distributive lattice to a Boolean ring, Bulletin of the American Mathematical Society
 1941: A Unified Theory of Integration, Proceedings of the National Academy of Sciences, Vol. 27

References

 P.T. Johnstone, (August 14, 1986) Stone Spaces, Cambridge University Press, 
 Everett Pitcher (1997) A History of the Second Fifty Years, American Mathematical Society, 1939-1988, page 251, American Mathematical Society 
 Who was who in America (1976) Marquis Who's Who, Volume VI, 1974–1976, Chicago, 

1907 births
1973 deaths
20th-century American mathematicians
American Rhodes Scholars
Bailey Island (Maine)
Harvard University faculty
Alumni of Balliol College, Oxford
Harvard University alumni
Kenyon College faculty
Scientists from New York City
People from Summit, New Jersey
Yale University alumni
Washington University in St. Louis faculty
Washington University in St. Louis mathematicians
Swarthmore College alumni
Mathematicians from New York (state)